John Mosier is an American academic known for his work in English, film, and history. Mosier was formerly a professor of English at Loyola University New Orleans.

Mosier received his Ph.D. in 1968, from Tulane University. He completed his dissertation on the links between poetry and historiography.

Mosier is probably best known for his revisionist military history books. These books The Myth of the Great War: A New Military History of World War I  and The Blitzkrieg Myth: How Hitler and the Allies Misread the Strategic Realities of World War II. In each of these books, Mosier challenges the current views held in regard to these conflicts. In The Myth of the Great War, Mosier argues that Germany was winning World War I, and only the arrival of the United States spared the Allies from military defeat and a negotiated peace with the Germans. In The Blitzkrieg Myth, Mosier argues that the supposedly revolutionary concept of blitzkrieg has been overrated and that most of the victories on both sides were the result of conventional military tactics. Both of these books and their theses remain controversial. In his 2010 book Deathride: Hitler vs. Stalin - The Eastern Front, 1941-1945, he posits that the Germans would surely have defeated the Soviets if not for the Allies, and that one of the Russians' problems is that they were "pathological liars".

He also published a military biography of Ulysses S. Grant. The book was revisionist in method; however, his thesis focused on the more traditional view that Grant was a genius. This deviates from Mosier's previous revisionist tendencies.

In addition to his books on military history, Mosier is a former film critic and serves on Cannes Film Festival committees. He also works as writer and editor for publications such as the journal of the Organization of American States.

Bibliography 

 The Myth of the Great War: A New Military History of World War I, Harper Perennial, 2002, paperback, 381 pages, 
 The Blitzkrieg Myth: How Hitler and the Allies Misread the Strategic Realities of World War II HarperCollins, 2003, hardcover, 400 pages,  
Cross of Iron: The Rise And Fall of the German War Machine, 1918-1945, Henry Holt & Co, 2006, hardcover, 336 pages, 
 Grant, Palgrave Macmillan, 2006, hardcover, 193 pages, 
Deathride: Hitler vs. Stalin - The Eastern Front, 1941-1945,  Simon & Schuster, 2010, hardcover, 480 pages, 
Verdun: The Lost History of the Most Important Battle of World War One, 1914-1918, Dutton Caliber, 2014, ISBN 9780451414632

References

External links
 Loyola University New Orleans  English Department website

Tulane University alumni
Loyola University New Orleans faculty
Living people
Year of birth missing (living people)